Than Swe is a Burmese diplomat and military officer. Since 1 February 2023, he has served as Myanmar's Minister for Foreign Affairs.

Early life and education 
Than Swe was born on 19 June 1953. He graduated from the 16th intake of the Defence Services Academy, alongside Wunna Maung Lwin, Thein Soe and Nyan Tun.

Military career 
Than Swe served in the Burmese Armed Forces from January 1975 to May 2000.

Post-military career 
Between May 2000 to March 2009, Than Swe worked in the Ministry of Progress of Border Areas and National Races and Development Affairs.  In July 2012, he was appointed as Myanmar's ambassador to the United States, becoming the first to serve since 2004 and signalling the restoration of full diplomatic ties between the two countries (see Myanmar–United States relations). Between 2004 and 2012, the Burmese government had appointed a lower-ranking charge d'affaires to the role.

After the 2021 Myanmar coup d'état, Than Swe was appointed as the head of the Union Civil Service Board, until August 2022. During his term, he reinstated policies during the Than Shwe era, including military-style uniforms for civil servants, and requirements to undergo military training and shooting practice for civil servants. He was appointed chair of the Anti-Corruption Commission of Myanmar on 19 August 2022. In November 2022, he was sanctioned by the European Union, for his role in legitimising the military coup and involvement in legal proceedings against the deposed leaders.

On 1 February 2023, the State Administration Council, Myanmar's military junta, appointed Than Swe as Minister for Foreign Affairs, replacing Wunna Maung Lwin.

Personal life 
Than Swe is married and has two daughters. His son-in-law, Aung Ko, was President Thein Sein's primary interpreter from 2011 to 2016.

See also 

 2021 Myanmar coup d'état
 Tatmadaw

References 

Living people
Burmese military personnel
1953 births
Defence Services Academy alumni
Burmese diplomats
Permanent Representatives of Myanmar to the United Nations
Ambassadors of Myanmar to the United States
Foreign ministers of Myanmar
Individuals related to Myanmar sanctions